Elliot Jager (born November 3, 1954) is an American-born Israeli journalist, political scientist, and author of The Pater: My Father, My Judaism, My Childlessness. He is a former editor at The Jerusalem Post and a former senior contributing editor at The Jerusalem Report. His second book, The Balfour Declaration: Sixty-Seven Words—100 Years of Conflict, was published in 2017.

Biography

Early life and work

Jager was born and raised on New York City's Lower East Side. His father was a Romanian-born Holocaust survivor who left for Israel when Jager was eight. Raised by his mother Yvette, Jager received a strictly Orthodox Jewish education. He obtained a BA in Judaic studies from Brooklyn College in 1977 and completed his MA (1988) and Ph.D. (1994) in political science at New York University.

Jager worked for the New York City Department of Health from 1973 until 1997 while attending college and university in the evening. He headed the control unit of the agency's lead poisoning program and was office services director for the Bureau of Operations before he left the agency. From 1984 until 1997, he taught political science as an adjunct visiting professor at NYU, Baruch College, Hofstra University, and Rutgers University. In 1997, Jager moved to Israel, where he met his wife, Lisa Clayton, a writer and editor.

Dissertation
Jager's Ph.D. dissertation examined the activities of the organized American Jewish community in regard to the 1988 decision by the United States to enter into a diplomatic dialogue with the Palestine Liberation Organization. In 2015, Jager made the dissertation available in digital form under the title "Leverage: How U.S. Presidents Use the American Jewish Community to Pressure Israel".

Journalistic and literary career
Between 1997 and 1999, Jager was a contributor to Jewish Ledger and Jewish Exponent. He joined the staff of The Jerusalem Post in 1999, holding various editorial positions at the paper, including literary editor, week-in-review editor, op-ed editor, and—taking over from Saul Singer—editorial page editor reporting to editor-in-chief David Horovitz. Jager left the Post to become the founding managing editor of Jewish Ideas Daily. He became a freelance writer in 2013, contributing regularly to such outlets as Newsmax and Israel My Glory magazine. In November 2015, he published his memoir, The Pater: My Father, My Judaism, My Childlessness. His second book, The Balfour Declaration: Sixty-Seven Words—100 Years of Conflict, was published in 2017.

Bibliography
 Leverage: How U.S. Presidents Use the American Jewish Community to Pressure Israel (2015)
 The Pater: My Father, My Judaism, My Childlessness (2015)
 The Balfour Declaration: Sixty-Seven Words—100 Years of Conflict (2017)

References

1954 births
Living people
Brooklyn College alumni
New York University alumni
American emigrants to Israel
Israeli newspaper journalists
Israeli memoirists
Israeli political scientists
People from the Lower East Side
American Zionists